Kamil Brzozowski (born 25 February 1987) is a former speedway rider from Poland.

Speedway career
He rode in the top tier of British Speedway riding for the Peterborough Panthers during the 2010 Elite League speedway season.

References 

1987 births
Living people
Polish speedway riders
Peterborough Panthers riders